The Connecticut Working Families Party is a political party in the U.S. state of Connecticut with approximately 300 members. It is an affiliate of the national Working Families Party. The party's support has been strongest in Hartford and Bridgeport and has been credited with helping ensure the election of Democrat Dannel Malloy in the 2010 gubernatorial election. The party primarily endorses like-minded Democrats but has run candidates against Democrats on the Working Families Party ballot line.

In a February 2015 special election, Ed Gomes was elected to the Connecticut State Senate using the WFP as his only ballot line, becoming the first Connecticut WFP member to do so.

References

Working Families Party
Political parties in Connecticut